Oswald Langdon Woodford (Oct. 31st, 1827-Oct. 21st, 1870) was an American minister, teacher, and politician.

Woodford was the son of Zerah and Minerva (Potter) Woodford, born on October 31, 1827.  He was a teacher for two years in the Cherokee Male Seminary, and then entered the Andover Theological Seminary. He returned to the Cherokees, and was principal of the Male Seminary until August 1856. He then came to New Haven, to attend Theological lectures, and in May 1857, went to Kansas as a Home Missionary. He settled in Grasshopper Falls, organizing a Congregational Church in 1858, however in 1859, he returned to his native town due to his health. He spent his remaining years with his parents, engaged in farming. In 1865 he was a member of the Connecticut State House of Representatives. In 1870, he died in West Avon of typhoid fever.

He was married, first, to Pauline Avery in 1856. She died in Kansas in 1858. He again married in May 1859 to Esther Butler.

References

External links

1827 births
1870 deaths
Yale University alumni
Andover Newton Theological School alumni
People from Avon, Connecticut
American Congregationalist ministers
Members of the Connecticut House of Representatives
19th-century American politicians
People from Valley Falls, Kansas
19th-century American clergy